Orange Empire Conference (OEC) is a community college athletic conference in Orange County, California.  Member institutions and the OEC are governed by the California Community College Athletic Association.

Commissioner
John Keever

Member Institutions
Cypress College
Fullerton College
Golden West College
Irvine Valley College
Norco College
Orange Coast College
Riverside City College
Saddleback College
Santa Ana College
Santiago Canyon College

External links
Official website

CCCAA conferences
Sports in Orange County, California